The Monkey's Raincoat is a 1987 detective novel by Robert Crais. It is the first in a series of linked novels centering on the private investigator Elvis Cole and his partner Joe Pike. Cole is a tough, wisecracking ex-Ranger with an irresistible urge to do what is morally right. The novel won the 1988 Anthony Award for "Best Paperback Original" at Bouchercon XIX and the 1988 Mystery Readers International Macavity Award for "Best First Novel"; and has since been named one of the 100 Favorite Mysteries of the Century by the Independent Mystery Booksellers Association.

Explanation of the novel's title
The title of the novel derives from a poem by the Japanese poet Matsuo Bashō which is quoted at the start of the novel:

Plot summary
Cole is hired by Ellen Lang to find her missing husband and son and in the end, with Cole and Pike's help, she kills former matador and crime boss Domingo Garcia Duran, the man responsible for her husband's death and her son's kidnapping. The facts behind the events leading to Ellen's husband's involvement with Duran and his death are revealed and her son Perry is restored to her.

Characters
 Elvis Cole – Private Detective, protagonist
 Janet Simon – Ellen Lang's friend; worked with Eric Filer at Universal
 Ellen Lang – Hires Elvis Cole to find missing husband and son, Perry
 Mort Lang – Ellen's husband
 Perry, Cindy, and Carrie Lang – The Langs' children
 Kimberly Marsh – Mort Lang's girlfriend
 George Feider – Private Investigator with 40+ years of experience, worked with Elvis
 Eric Filer – Worked with Janet at Universal
 Garrett Rice – Mort Lang's best friend and co-producer on a project with Mort
 Joe Pike – Detective/Elvis' partner
 Cleon Tyner – Garrett Rice's hired "security"
 Simms and Eddie – Cops on the scene after Ellen's house was tossed
 Patricia Kyle – Former Cole client, works at General Entertainment Studios
 Clarence Wu – Owner of Wu's Engraving
 Lou Poitras – Cole's police contact, a detective out of North Hollywood

Alternative ending
Robert Crais' original outline for the novel had Joe Pike getting killed at the end, so that he would have a moment of tragedy that would push Elvis Cole on to the rescue of the boy.

Awards and nominations
 1988 Anthony Award for "Best Paperback Original"
 1988 Mystery Readers International Macavity Award for "Best First Novel"
 1988 Edgar Award nominee for "Best Paperback Original"
 1988 Shamus Award nominee for "Best Original P.I. Paperback"

Release details
1987, United States of America, Bantam Books , Pub Date 1987, Paperback
1989, United Kingdom, Piatkus Books /978-0-86188-817-7, Pub Date February 1989, Hardback

Footnotes

1987 American novels
Novels by Robert Crais
Anthony Award-winning works
Macavity Award-winning works